Elio Verde (born 10 September 1987, in Trentola-Ducenta) is an Italian judoka who competes in the men's  category. At the 2012 Summer Olympics, he was defeated in the semi finals.

References

External links
 
 

Italian male judoka
1987 births
Living people
Olympic judoka of Italy
Judoka at the 2012 Summer Olympics
Mediterranean Games gold medalists for Italy
Competitors at the 2009 Mediterranean Games
Mediterranean Games medalists in judo
European Games competitors for Italy
Judoka at the 2015 European Games
Judoka of Fiamme Oro
Competitors at the 2013 Mediterranean Games
20th-century Italian people
21st-century Italian people